Emarat (also Romanized as ‘Emārat) is a village in Minjavan-e Sharqi Rural District, Minjavan District, Khoda Afarin County, East Azerbaijan Province, Iran. At the 2006 census, its population was 151, in 37 families.

References 

Populated places in Khoda Afarin County